The Rosario and San Bernardo Corals National Natural Park is a natural park located in the Sucre and Bolívar Departments on the coast of the Caribbean Region of Colombia, 45 km from the Bay of Cartagena. It was the most visited national park in Colombia in 2009, with 318,473 visitors.

Most of the park is underwater and it mainly protects marine ecosystems, including coral reefs living on depths ranging from one to 30 meters.

General
It is Colombia's only underwater park, and one of three national parks in the Colombian Caribbean with coral reefs on its territories, the other two being Tayrona and Old Providence McBean Lagoon.

It was established in 1977 to protect the coral reef on one of the islands in the Islas del Rosario archipelago, originally extending .

The park is molded by the Caribbean and Panama currents, as well as freshwater from the Canal del Dique. Sediments brought from Magdalena River by the channel is having a negative effect of the park, as it deteriorates the reef. There are no bodies of freshwater in the park, but there is brackish water in some of the lagoons on the islands. Average yearly temperature is 27–30 °C.

Flora and fauna
Most of the wildlife is marine. The park is home to 170 species of fish, 52 corals, 25 sponges, hundreds of molluscs and crustaceans. The flora is characterized by mangroves and seagrass beds.

References

Citations

References

External links
The parks page at Parques Nacionales Naturales de Colombia 

National parks of Colombia
Protected areas established in 1977
Geography of Sucre Department
Geography of Bolívar Department
1977 establishments in Colombia
Tourist attractions in Bolívar Department
Tourist attractions in Sucre Department